Dozakh in Search of Heaven ('Hell in Search of Heaven') is an Bollywood Hindi-Urdu film written and directed by Zaigham Imam, which premiered at the Kolkata International Film Festival on 12 November 2013. It was jointly produced by Imam and Pawan Tiwari who is also acting in the film. It is an adaptation of a book by the same name written by Zaigham Imam.

Cast
 Lalit Mohan Tiwari as Maulvi Sahab
 Nazim Khan as Panditji 
 Garrick Chaudhary as Janu  
 Pawan Tiwari as Auto driver
 Ruby Saini as Amma

Festivals
Dozakh has been screened at various film festivals across the world. These include Kolkata International Film Festival; Habitat Film Festival 2014, Bangalore International Film Festival 2013; 12 Third Eye Asian Film Festival, Mumbai; Indian International Film Festival of Queensland 2014; 3rd Ladakh International Film Festival; Hidden Gems Film Festival, Canada.

Controversies
The film had a minor run in the censor board when it was denied a certificate at first two screenings, Mid-day reported on the same.

Critical reception
DNA newspaper in a review of the film stated, "Dozakh reinforces the influence that cinema can have on the thought process of a society." Deccan Herald wrote, "potent theme of religious tension will leave audiences spell bound".

References

External links
 
 

Indian drama films
2013 drama films
2013 films
2010s Hindi-language films
2010s Urdu-language films
2013 multilingual films
Indian multilingual films